Alfred Sidney Hogg (6 September 1902 – 22 June 1973) was an Australian rules footballer who played with South Melbourne in the Victorian Football League (VFL).

Notes

External links 

1902 births
1973 deaths
Australian rules footballers from Melbourne
Sydney Swans players
People from South Melbourne